Richard Kingsley Morgan, (born 24 September 1965 in Norwich) is a British science fiction and fantasy author of books, short stories, and graphic novels. He is the winner of the Philip K. Dick Award for his 2003 book Altered Carbon, which was adapted into a Netflix series released in 2018. His third book, Market Forces, won the John W. Campbell Award in 2005, while his 2008 work Thirteen garnered him the Arthur C. Clarke Award.

Early life and education 

Morgan was born in Norfolk, and brought up in the village of Hethersett, near Norwich, and had a semi-rural upbringing. He attended private school and later studied modern languages and history at Queens' College, Cambridge. After graduating he started teaching English in order to travel the world. After 14 years and a post at the University of Strathclyde, his first novel was published and he became a full-time writer. He lived in Glasgow until 2015, when he moved to Saxlingham Nethergate with his wife Virginia and their son Daniel.

Literary career

In 2002, Morgan's first novel Altered Carbon was published, combining elements of "cyberpunk" and hardboiled detective fiction and featuring the antihero Takeshi Kovacs. In 2003 the U.S. edition of Altered Carbon received the Philip K. Dick Award and the film rights were sold for a reported figure of $1,000,000 to film producer Joel Silver, enabling Morgan to become a full-time writer. The film rights were later acquired by Laeta Kalogridis, but production was trapped in development hell for a decade, eventually gaining release in 2018 as a Netflix series.

In 2003, Broken Angels was published, the sequel to Altered Carbon, again featuring Takeshi Kovacs and blending science fiction and war fiction in a similar way to his cross-genre début. The success of this book solidified his literary reputation.

Market Forces, Morgan's first non-Kovacs novel, is set in the near future. It was originally written as a short story, then as a screenplay (both unpublished). After the success of his first two works, it was released as a novel and optioned as a film.

Morgan's third Kovacs novel, intended as the final novel in the series, Woken Furies, was released in the UK in March 2005 and in the U.S. in September 2005. In this novel, the Takeshi Kovacs character comes into his own as a hero, not merely a long-black-coat clad, boilerplate antihero.

Morgan wrote two six-issue miniseries for Marvel Comics under the Marvel Knights imprint. His first story, Black Widow: Homecoming published monthly in 2004 was followed by a second, Black Widow: The Things They Say About Her published monthly in 2005; both are available in collected editions. According to Morgan's official website the series was "an artefact of limited appeal" and is unlikely to be continued, although he has other comic projects in development.

Black Man was released in May 2007 in the UK and in June 2007 in the United States (as Thirteen or Th1rte3n). Later UK editions were published with the Thirteen title. According to the author, the book is about the constraints of physicality and the idea that people are locked into who they are. These are things he could not deal with in the Kovacs universe, because for Kovacs and people like him mortality is avoidable: they just skip into a new body. The novel won the 2008 Arthur C. Clarke Award.

Morgan wrote a fantasy trilogy with a gay protagonist, A Land Fit for Heroes, the first volume of which has the title The Steel Remains and was published in August 2008 in the UK and on 20 January 2009 in the United States. The second volume, titled The Cold Commands was published in 2011. The third book in the series is called The Dark Defiles and was published on 17 August 2014.

Liber Primus Games is creating a gamebook series based on the A Land Fit For Heroes trilogy. The first game was published for Android, Apple and Amazon Kindle Fire devices on 4 November 2015. The release of the PC game was announced in May 2016.

In 2008, he worked with Starbreeze as a writer for Syndicate, the 2012 re-imagining of the 1992 video game. Additionally, Morgan worked with Electronic Arts and Crytek as lead writer for their 2011 video game, Crysis 2.

In October 2018, Morgan's science fiction novel, Thin Air was published in the UK by Gollancz.

In an interview before the launch of Thin Air, Morgan described a common feature of his works:

A graphic novel titled Altered Carbon: Download Blues, which continues to follow the character Takeshi Kovacs, was released in July 2019.

An animated feature entitled Altered Carbon: Resleeved was released in 2020 on Netflix.

Morgan's books are generally set in a post-extropianist dystopian world. Morgan described his "takeaway" of one of his books as:

Bibliography

Takeshi Kovacs novels
 Altered Carbon (2002) 
 Broken Angels (2003) 
 Woken Furies (2005)

A Land Fit For Heroes
 The Steel Remains (2008) 
 The Cold Commands (2011) 
 The Dark Defiles (2014)

Black Man novels 
 Black Man (2007)  (known as Thirteen or Th1rte3n in the United States and in later UK editions )
 Thin Air (2018) 
 Gone Machine (2023)

Other novels
 Market Forces (2004)

Graphic novels
 Black Widow: Homecoming (2005) 
 Black Widow: The Things They Say About Her (2006) 
 Crysys (2012) 
Altered Carbon: Download Blues (2019) 
Altered Carbon: One Life, One Death (2022)

Video games
 Crysis 2 (2011)
 Syndicate (2012)
 A Land Fit For Heroes (2015)

Music
 "Woken Furies" from the album Dark All Day by Gunship (2018)

References

External links

Interviews
 Interview: Richard Morgan - The Sydney Morning Herald
 Science Fiction Weekly interview
 Interview with author Richard K. Morgan, "Richard K. Morgan: The New King of Cyberpunk Fiction", Jewels Gallegos Merced 09/19/2005 for JIVE Magazine
 InfinityPlus interview
 Morgan Week interviews and reviews
 Interview Clarkesworld Magazine 2008-9
 Interview on the SciFiDimensions Podcast

1965 births
Living people
English science fiction writers
English male novelists
Cyberpunk writers
Writers from London
Academics of the University of Strathclyde
Alumni of Queens' College, Cambridge
People from Hethersett